The following is a list of notable people who have lived in Nashville, Tennessee.

Native Nashvillians
People born in Nashville:

Musicians and songwriters
With its status as a major hub of music production (especially country and gospel music), Nashville attracts a wide array of musicians, singers, and songwriters.

Roy Acuff – country singer-songwriter; co-founder (with Fred Rose) of the Acuff-Rose publishing house
Dean Alexander – country singer-songwriter
Chet Atkins – country guitarist and record producer
The Band Perry – country pop band
Dave Barnes – acoustic singer-songwriter
Greg Bates – country singer-songwriter
David Berman – singer-songwriter of Silver Jews
Beeb Birtles – former member of Little River Band
Pat Boone (Charles Eugene Boone) – pop singer and actor
Bully – rock band
J. J. Cale – songwriter and musician, known for writing "After Midnight" and "Cocaine"
Glen Campbell – pop and country musician, TV personality and actor, sang "Rhinestone Cowboy" and "By the Time I Get to Phoenix"
Johnny Cash – country singer-songwriter and actor, known to his fans as "The Man in Black"
June Carter Cash – country singer-songwriter, wife of Johnny Cash, and member of the A.P. Carter Family
Desmond Child – hit rock/pop songwriter for Cher, Kiss, Aerosmith, Ricky Martin, Bonnie Tyler, Bon Jovi, and others
Cimorelli – YouTube girl group, originally from El Dorado Hills, California
The Civil Wars – folk/Americana duo
Kelly Clarkson – pop singer-songwriter, first winner of American Idol
Patsy Cline – country singer-songwriter, first woman in Country Music Hall of Fame
Kyle Cook – singer-songwriter of Matchbox Twenty
Rita Coolidge – pop recording artist and songwriter
Billy Cox – bassist, last surviving member of the Jimi Hendrix Experience
Sheryl Crow – singer-songwriter, actress
Billy Ray Cyrus – country singer-songwriter, and actor; father of Miley Cyrus and Noah Cyrus
Miley Cyrus – country/pop singer-songwriter, star of Hannah Montana; daughter of Billy Ray Cyrus and older sister of Noah Cyrus
Noah Cyrus – singer-songwriter, and actress; daughter of Billy Ray Cyrus and younger sister of Miley Cyrus
Steve Earle – country singer-songwriter
Tommy Emmanuel – guitarist, native to Australia but lives in Nashville
The Everly Brothers – pop music duo
Zac Farro – drummer
Fisk Jubilee Singers – gospel choir
Lester Flatt – bluegrass pioneer
Béla Fleck – banjoist, lived in Nashville most of his young adulthood, originally from New York City
Dan Fogelberg – singer-songwriter of diverse musical styles, top-selling musician of 1970s-80s
Ben Folds – singer-songwriter, former frontman of Ben Folds Five
Framing Hanley – alternative rock band
Peter Frampton – English rock musician, producer, songwriter, lives in Nashville
Russ Freeman - lead of award-winning jazz band, The Rippingtons
Kathy Lee Gifford – television host, singer-songwriter, actress, and author
Josh Gracin – country singer
Amy Grant – singer-songwriter known for Christian themes
Emmylou Harris – country singer-songwriter, and musician
Kerry Harvick – country singer-songwriter, cast member of the hit reality series Bad Girls Club
Brandon Heath – Christian singer-songwriter
Bobby Hebb – R&B/soul songwriter, musician, singer known for the song "Sunny"
John Hiatt – songwriter and musician
Faith Hill – country music singer
Robyn Hitchcock – English alternative-rock musician
Hot Chelle Rae – popular rock pop band
Harlan Howard – Music Row songwriter
David Hungate – bassist for Toto, also recorded with several country artists
Alan Jackson – country singer-songwriter
Waylon Jennings – country singer-guitarist
Naomi Judd – mother-daughter (with Wynonna Judd) country music singer-songwriter
Wynonna Judd – mother-daughter (with Naomi Judd) country music singer-songwriter 
Jet Jurgensmeyer – teen actor and musician
Kesha – pop singer
Kings of Leon – rock musicians
Robert Knight – R&B singer best known for the hit "Everlasting Love"
Kris Kristofferson – country singer-songwriter and actor
Lady Antebellum – country music trio group
Brenda Lee – pop singer, Rock and Roll Hall of Fame and Grammy Lifetime Achievement Award
Little Big Town – country music group
Little Richard – rock musician
Kimberley Locke – pop and R&B singer
Liam Lynch – musician and co-creator of the television show Sifl and Olly
Loretta Lynn – country singer-songwriter
Mandisa – Christian music artist
Barbara Mandrell – country singer-songwriter 
Chris Marion – member of classic rock's Little River Band
Martina McBride – singer-songwriter
Tim McGraw – country music singer-songwriter and actor
Reba McEntire – country music singer and actress
Roger Miller – country singer-songwriter, known for "King of the Road"
Neal Morse – singer-songwriter, multi-instrumentalist, bandleader and progressive rock composer based in Nashville
Dave Mustaine – lead musician for heavy metal band Megadeth
Willie Nelson – guitarist and country singer, member of the outlaw country movement
Aaron Neville – soul singer and member of the Neville Brothers; displaced from his native New Orleans by Hurricane Katrina
The New Schematics – indie rock band
John Oates – hit rock and soul recording artist from duo Hall & Oates, has homes in Colorado and Nashville
St. Louis Jimmy Oden – blues pianist, born here in 1903
Roy Orbison – singer-songwriter, Rock and Roll Hall of Fame, known for "Pretty Woman"
Brad Paisley – country singer-songwriter
Paramore – rock musicians
Dolly Parton – country singer-songwriter and actress
Johnny Paycheck – country singer
Wayne Perry – country singer-songwriter and producer
Kellie Pickler – country music singer-songwriter
Poppy – pop singer-songwriter
Millard Powers – member of Counting Crows, musician, songwriter, producer, engineer
Rascal Flatts – country music trio
Caroline Keating Reed – pianist and music teacher
Tex Ritter – singing cowboy
Earl Scruggs – bluegrass banjo player
Ed Sheeran – English singer, songwriter, producer, actor
Blake Shelton – country singer, judge on TV series The Voice
Paul Sikes – singer-songwriter and record producer
Michael W. Smith – Christian music artist
Soccer Mommy – indie rock back fronted by Sophie Allison
Chris Stapleton – country/bluegrass/rock musician 
Starlito – rapper
Edwin Starr – '70s funk singer
Marty Stuart – country/bluegrass musician; host of his own show on RFD-TV
Donna Summer – disco and R&B singer
Emma Swift – Australian country/Americana musician
Taylor Swift – one of the world's top-selling singer-songwriters
Thompson Square – country music duo
Ernest Tubb – singer-songwriter, one of the pioneers of country music
Shania Twain – country music singer-songwriter
Steven Tyler – lead singer-songwriter of rock band Aerosmith
Keith Urban – country music superstar, married to Nicole Kidman
Townes Van Zandt – folk music singer-songwriter
Gillian Welch – contemporary "alt-country" songwriter and singer
Kitty Wells – singer and musician from country music's early days
Matt Wertz – acoustic singer-songwriter
Dottie West – country singer-songwriter 
Jack White – guitarist and lead vocalist of The White Stripes
Hayley Williams – musician, songwriter, lyricist
Allen Woody – bassist for the Allman Brothers Band and Gov't Mule
Victor Wooten – virtuoso electric bass guitar player
 Emily Wright – songwriter, producer and engineer
Tammy Wynette – country singer-songwriter, known for "Stand By Your Man"
Dwight Yoakam – country musician, songwriter and actor
Taylor York – musician, songwriter, lyricist
Young Buck – rapper and member of G-Unit

Political figures

National

Edward Carmack – former U.S. Senator, newspaper editor, and attorney
Bill Frist – former U.S. Senate Majority Leader
Al Gore, Jr. – former U.S. Vice President and Senator; recipient of the Nobel Peace Prize
Tipper Gore – Second Lady of the United States 1993–2001
Andrew Jackson – former U.S. President
Andrew Johnson – former U.S. President and Vice President 
John Lewis – civil rights leader, U.S. Congressman (GA 5th Dist.), and former SNCC chairman
Fred Meyer – treasurer of Aladdin Industries in Nashville, pre-1971; chairman of the Republican Party of Texas, 1988–1994; president of Tyler Corporation in Dallas, 1983–1986; native of suburban Chicago
James K. Polk – former U.S. President 
Fred Thompson – former U.S. Senator and actor

Local

Megan Barry – first female mayor of Nashville; first female mayor of Nashville to resign office
Phil Bredesen – mayor of Nashville 1991–99, governor of Tennessee 2003–2011
John Ray Clemmons (born 1977) – member of the Tennessee House of Representatives, representing the 55th district, in West Nashville
Karl Dean – former mayor of Nashville
John Jay Hooker – attorney, perennial candidate, and political gadfly
Diane Neighbors – vice mayor of Nashville, 2007–2015

Other Nashvillians

Artists and writers
Greg Downs – Flannery O'Connor Award-winning short story writer
Tony Earley – novelist and short story writer
Karen Kingsbury – novelist
Harmony Korine – filmmaker and artist
Rachel Korine – actress and photographer, married to Harmony Korine
Alan LeQuire – sculptor
Ann Patchett – novelist
T. M. Schleier – early photographer
Robert Penn Warren – Pulitzer Prize-winning novelist and poet
Tennessee Williams – foremost playwright of 20th-century drama, lived briefly in Nashville

Business leaders
Mike Curb – founder of Curb Records, former Lieutenant Governor of California
George A. Dickel – liquor distributor
Dick Griffey – record producer, music promoter 
Preston Taylor – minister, businessperson, philanthropist

Civic leaders
William N. Bilbo – attorney, lobbyist for passage of the 13th Amendment, ending slavery
William Driver – nicknamed the U.S. flag "Old Glory"
Francis Guess – Nashville businessman and member of the United States Commission on Civil Rights (1983–1989)
James Lawson – civil rights leader and Methodist minister
Z. Alexander Looby – lawyer active in the American Civil Rights Movement
Dan May – civic leader
Diane Nash – civil rights leader
Azariah Southworth – former host of a Christian television show; LGBT rights advocate

Entertainers
Nate Bargatze – comedian
Rachel DiPillo – actress, currently stars in NBC's Chicago Med
Doug the Pug – famous dog
Natalia Dyer – actress
Ralph Emery – country music disc jockey and television host
Eddie Frierson – voice actor, playwright
Kathie Lee Gifford – television personality and former star of NBC's Today show
Phil Harris – comedian, actor, singer, and jazz musician
Ashley Judd – actress and political activist
Demetria Kalodimos – Emmy Award-winning anchor for WSMV-TV
Nicole Kidman – actress
Sondra Locke (1944–2018) – Oscar-nominated actress from Shelbyville, Tennessee lived briefly in Nashville
Minnie Pearl (Sarah Cannon) – country comedian who appeared frequently on the Grand Ole Opry
Dinah Shore – singer, actress, and television personality
Richard Speight, Jr. – actor
Mary Steenburgen – actress, songwriter wife of Ted Danson
Frank Sutton – actor, played Sergeant Carter on the hit TV series Gomer Pyle
Austin Swift – actor, brother of Taylor Swift
Niki Taylor – supermodel and TV presenter
Adair Tishler – actress
Jim Varney – actor, known for his character Ernest P. Worrell
Dawn Wells – actress, Gilligan's Island
William Wilkerson – founder of Flamingo Las Vegas hotel, Ciro's nightclub
Oprah Winfrey – talk show host, movie producer, and entrepreneur
Reese Witherspoon – Academy Award-winning actress
Evan Rachel Wood – actress, musician, and star of TV series Westworld

Journalists and talk show hosts
Tomi Lahren – political commentator for Fox News
Jon Meacham – Pulitzer Prize-winning author; former Newsweek editor
Dave Ramsey – talk radio host and author
Grantland Rice – sportswriter
Fred Russell – sportswriter
John Seigenthaler, Jr. – MSNBC news anchor; son of John Seigenthaler, Sr.

Religious leaders
Richard Henry Boyd – founder and head of the National Baptist Publishing Board
Virginia E. Walker Broughton – African American author and Baptist missionary
James T. Draper, Jr. – president of the Southern Baptist Convention, 1982–1984; president of Nashville-based LifeWay Christian Resources, 1991–2006

Sportspeople
Mookie Betts – baseball player
Tracy Caulkins – three-time Olympic gold medalist swimmer
Eddie George – Heisman Trophy winner, four-time Pro Bowl NFL running back, businessman and professional actor
Sonny Gray – Major League Baseball pitcher
Scott Hamilton – world champion and Olympic gold medalist ice skater
Adam Hooker – 2008 Slamball League MVP and starting stopper for Champion Slashers
Andy Kirby – NASCAR driver
Jessica Kresa – professional wrestler, known as ODB
Herb Rich (1928–2008), 2x All-Pro NFL football player
Wilma Rudolph – track star and Olympic gold medalist
Martin Strel – long-distance swimmer, Big River Man and actor from Slovenia

Criminals and victims
Jesse James – notorious outlaw and bank robber
Abdulhakim Mujahid Muhammad, fka Carlos Leon Bledsoe – committed the 2009 jihadi Little Rock military recruiting office shooting
Marcia Trimble – victim of an infamous child murder case

Other
Mary R. Calvert (1884–1974) – astronomical computer and astrophotographer
Joseph Fuisz – attorney, inventor, and entrepreneur; founder of Fuisz Pharma LLC
Richard Fuisz – physician, inventor, and entrepreneur, with connections to the United States military and intelligence community
Amelia Laskey – ornithologist
Nat Love – famous African-American cowboy and hero of the Old West
Ronal W. Serpas – Chief of the Metropolitan Nashville Police Department, 2004–2010

See also
List of people from Tennessee

Notes

References

 
Nashville
Nashville
People